Naked Lunch is a novel by William S. Burroughs.

Naked Lunch may also refer to:

Naked Lunch (film), a film adaptation of the Burroughs novel
Naked Lunch (Austrian band), a band from Klagenfurt, Austria, founded in 1991
Naked Lunch (UK band), a UK synth pop band formed in 1979